A state bureau of investigation (SBI) is a state-level detective agency in the United States. They are plainclothes agencies which usually investigate both criminal and civil cases involving the state and/or multiple jurisdictions. They also typically provide technical support to local agencies in the form of laboratory and/or record services, or to directly assist in the investigation of cases at the local agency's request.

An SBI is a state's equivalent to the Federal Bureau of Investigation, but can include investigative jurisdiction similar to other federal law enforcement agencies as well. The SBIs investigate all manner of cases assigned to them by their state's laws and usually report to their state's attorney general, or in some cases, directly to their state's governor.

SBIs can also exist either independently or within a state Department of Public Safety/Department of Justice (which is an umbrella agency coordinating and/or controlling the various state-level law enforcement agencies) or a state police force (which is a general law enforcement agency).

Specific state forces

 Alabama
Alabama Bureau of Investigation
Alabama Highway Patrol
 Alaska
Alaska Bureau of Investigation (ABI)
 Arizona
 Arizona Attorney General's Office - Criminal Division 
 Arkansas
 Arkansas Department of Public Safety
Arkansas State Police
Arkansas Criminal Investigations 
Arkansas Crimes Against Children 
 California
 California Department of Justice (CA DOJ) – Special Agents assigned to various investigative bureaus:
 Bureau of Investigation
 Bureau of Firearms
 Bureau of Gambling Control
 Bureau of Forensic Services
 Bureau of Medi-Cal Fraud & Elder Abuse
 California Highway Patrol – Freeway traffic investigations
 Colorado
Colorado Bureau of Investigation
 Connecticut
Connecticut Bureau of Criminal Investigations
 Delaware
 Delaware State Police
 Criminal Investigations Units
 Special Investigations Section
Delaware Department of Justice
Office of the Attorney General - Special Investigators
 Florida
 Florida Department of Law Enforcement (SBI)
 Florida Highway Patrol
 Georgia
Georgia Bureau of Investigation
 Hawaii
 Hawaii Department of the Attorney General – Investigations Division
 Hawaii Department of Public Safety – Sheriff Division
 Idaho
 Idaho State Police – Investigation Division
 Illinois
 Illinois State Police – Illinois Bureau of Investigation (merged into the State Police Operations Division in the 1970s) (SPI)
 Indiana
 Indiana State Police – Criminal Investigation Division (SBI)
 Iowa
 Iowa Department of Public Safety
 Division of Criminal Investigation
 Kansas
Kansas Bureau of Investigation (SBI)
 Kentucky
Kentucky Department of Criminal Investigation (SBI)
 Louisiana
 Louisiana State Police
 Maine
 Maine State Police
 Office of the Maine Attorney General Investigation Division
 Maryland
 Maryland State Police
 Massachusetts
 Massachusetts State Police — State Police Detective Units 
Michigan
Michigan State Police
Michigan Department of Attorney General Criminal Division SBI
Michigan Department of Attorney General Financial Crimes Division SBI
 Minnesota
 Minnesota Department of Public Safety
 Minnesota Bureau of Criminal Apprehension (SBI)
 Mississippi
 Mississippi Bureau of Investigation (SBI)
 Missouri
 Missouri Department of Public Safety
 Montana
 Montana Department of Justice – Division of Criminal Investigations
 Nebraska
 Nebraska State Patrol – Investigative Services
 Nevada
 Nevada Investigation Division
 New Hampshire
 New Hampshire Department of Safety – Division of State Police – Investigative Services Bureau
 New Jersey
 New Jersey Division of Criminal Justice
 New Jersey State Detectives
 New Mexico
 New Mexico State Police – Special Investigations Division
New York
 New York State Police – Bureau of Criminal Investigation (BCI).
 North Carolina
 North Carolina State Bureau of Investigation
 North Dakota
 North Dakota Office of the Attorney General – North Dakota Bureau of Criminal Investigations (Attorney General's website)
 Ohio
 Ohio Attorney General – Ohio Bureau of Criminal Investigation (SBI)
 Oklahoma
 Oklahoma State Bureau of Investigation an independent agency
 Oregon
 Oregon Department of Justice – Criminal Justice Division
 Pennsylvania
 Pennsylvania Office of the Attorney General – Bureau of Criminal Investigations
 Pennsylvania State Police – Bureau of Criminal Investigation
 Puerto Rico
 Puerto Rico Department of Justice
 Puerto Rico Department of Public Safety
 Puerto Rico Police
 Puerto Rico Special Investigations Bureau
 Rhode Island
 Rhode Island State Police – Detective Bureau
 South Carolina
 South Carolina Law Enforcement Division (SLED) – an independent agency
 South Dakota
 South Dakota Division of Criminal Investigation
 Tennessee
 Tennessee Bureau of Investigation – an independent agency  (SBI)
 Texas
 Texas Department of Public Safety
 Texas Rangers
 Criminal Investigations Division
 Texas Attorney General's Office – Criminal Investigations Division 
 Utah
 Utah Department of Public Safety – State Bureau of Investigation
 Vermont
 Vermont State Police – Bureau of Criminal Investigations
 Virginia
 Virginia State Police – Bureau of Criminal Investigation
 Washington
 Washington State Patrol – Criminal Investigations Division
 West Virginia
 West Virginia State Police – Bureau of Criminal Investigations
 Wisconsin
 Wisconsin Department of Justice – Division of Criminal Investigation (SBI)
 Wyoming
 Wyoming Division of Criminal Investigation

See also
 Law enforcement in the United States
 State  (United States)
 Federal Bureau of Investigation
 Department of public safety
 Landeskriminalamt – German states
 Civil Police (Brazil) – Brazilian state detective agencies

References